The Indian 2-rupee note was a denomination of Rupee introduced in 1943. It is the second smallest note ever printed in India. It was removed from circulation in 1995.

See also
Indian 5-rupee note

Indian 2-rupee coin

References 

Rupee
Currencies introduced in 1943
Banknotes of India
Two-base-unit banknotes